Aberdeen F.C. competed in Scottish Football League Division One and Scottish Cup in season 1923–24.

Overview

Aberdeen finished in 13th place in Scottish Division One in 1923–24. The top scorer was Johnny Miller, with 14 goals from 35 league appearances. In the Scottish Cup, Aberdeen reached the semi finals, only to lose out to Hibernian after two replays.

Results

Scottish Division One

Final standings

Scottish Cup

Squad

Appearances & Goals

|}

References

Aberdeen F.C. seasons
Aberdeen